Hosein Amiri-Domari (born 1994) is an Iranian screenwriter and director. He has been nominated for the Crystal Simorgh three times.
Amiri-Domari and Pedram Pouramiri are credited as "the youngest directors of Iranian cinema", producing their first film when they were 23.

Filmography

Awards

References

External links

Iranian screenwriters
1994 births
Living people
Iranian directors